Phani means a serpent in Sanskrit language. It may refer to:

Phani Majumdar, Indian director
Phani Ramachandra, Indian film and television director
Phani Sarma, Assamese actor and director
Phanis, a species of beetle

Indian masculine given names